Gladys Le Mare, née Keay (1912 – 1967) graduated with first class honours in zoology from St Hugh's College Oxford. She taught in South Africa until 1939 when she left for Singapore to marry Deryck Watts Le Mare (1912-1967), then Asst Director of Fisheries, Straits Settlements.

In 1940, Le Mare became one of the founders Malaysian Nature Society and the founding editor of the Malayan Nature Journal.

Selected publications
 "Research on the seasonal occurrence of harvest mites (Trombicula autumnalis) on voles and mice near Oxford", in: Parasitology, 28, 110-114, 1936
 "The ecology of the harvest mite in the British Isles", in: Journal of Animal Ecology, 6, 23-35, 1937.

References

1912 births
1967 deaths
British science writers
Malaysian non-fiction writers
Malaysian biologists
Malaysian women writers
Women science writers
Women zoologists
Alumni of St Hugh's College, Oxford
Straits Settlements people
20th-century British zoologists
20th-century Malaysian people
20th-century British non-fiction writers
20th-century British women scientists
20th-century English women writers
Women magazine editors
British expatriates in South Africa
British emigrants to Malaysia